New York's 4th State Assembly district is one of the 150 districts in the New York State Assembly. It has been represented by Republican Edward Flood since 2023, defeating then 30-year incumbent Steven Englebright.

Geography
District 4 is in Suffolk County. The district includes portions of the town of Brookhaven including Belle Terre, Old Field, Poquott, and Port Jefferson. Stony Brook University is within this district.

Recent election results

2022

2020

2018

2016

2014

2012

2010

References

4
Nassau County, New York